"Don't Wanna Be a Player" is a song by the American R&B singer Joe. It was written by Joe, Japhe Tejeda, Jolyon Skinner, Michele Williams and Rodney Jerkins, and produced by the latter for Joe's second studio album All That I Am (1997). Released as a single from the Booty Call (1997) soundtrack as well as All That I Ams second single, it reached number 21 on the Billboard Hot 100 and became Joe's second top ten hit on the Hot R&B/Hip-Hop Songs chart, reaching number five. In the United Kingdom, "Don't Wanna Be a Player" peaked at number 16 on the UK Singles Chart, ranking among his highest-charting singles there.

Track listings

Credits and personnel
 Tom Brick – mastering
 Rodney Jerkins – mixing, producer, writer
 Dexter Simmons – mixing, recording
 Jolyon Skinner – writer
 Japhe Tejeda – guitar, writer
 Joe Thomas – mixing, vocals, writer
 Michele Williams – writer

Charts

References

1997 singles
Joe (singer) songs
Song recordings produced by Rodney Jerkins
Songs written by Rodney Jerkins
Songs written by Jolyon Skinner
Songs written by Joe (singer)
Songs written by Michele Williams
1997 songs
Jive Records singles